Datavant is a health information technology company based in San Francisco, CA, USA, which develops and maintains a digital ecosystem for the exchange of healthcare data. Datavant's clients include clinical research organizations, pharmaceutical companies, payers, analytics companies, hospitals, and providers, operating primarily in the US healthcare market.

The company operates the COVID-19 Research Database along with the Health Care Cost Institute, Snowflake, Elsevier, Parexel, and others, which "enables public health and policy researchers to use real-world data to understand and combat the COVID-19 pandemic."

History 
Datavant was co-founded by Roivant Sciences in 2017 with a focus on data management in support of clinical trials. Datavant's founding CEO was Travis May, a former co-founder of LiveRamp. 

The company received a $40.5mm Series A investment in 2018 led by Roivant Sciences, followed by a $40mm Series B investment in 2020. In June 2021, Datavant entered into a seven billion dollar deal to acquire the EMR platform developer Ciox Health. Following the merger, May became president and joined the company's board, while Ciox's CEO Pete McCabe become the CEO of the joint entity that continued under the Datavant name. Also in June 2021, Datavant announced a partnership with Biodesix, a data-driven diagnostics company.

References 

Health information technology companies
Technology companies based in the San Francisco Bay Area
Health informatics
2017 establishments in California